Physospermum is a genus of flowering plants belonging to the family Apiaceae.

Its native range is Europe to Iran, Algeria.

Species:

Physospermum cornubiense 
Physospermum verticillatum

References

Apioideae
Apioideae genera